Rutajärvi is a medium-sized lake in Joutsa municipality, next to the Leivonmäki National Park in Central Finland region. The western shores of the lake are included to the park.

References

See also
List of lakes in Finland

Lakes of Joutsa